The 1909–10 season was Galatasaray SK's 6th in existence and the club's 4th consecutive season in the IFL. Galatasaray won the league for the second time.

Squad statistics

Competitions

Istanbul Football League

Classification

Matches
Kick-off listed in local time (EEST)

Friendly Matches

References
 Tuncay, Bülent (2002). Galatasaray Tarihi. Yapı Kredi Yayınları 
 1909-1910 İstanbul Futbol Ligi. Türk Futbol Tarihi vol.1. page(31). (June 1992) Türkiye Futbol Federasyonu Yayınları.

External links
 Galatasaray Sports Club Official Website 
 Turkish Football Federation - Galatasaray A.Ş. 
 uefa.com - Galatasaray AŞ

Galatasaray S.K. (football) seasons
Turkish football clubs 1909–10 season
1900s in Istanbul
1910s in Istanbul